Miribel is a commune in the Ain department in eastern France.

It is a northeastern suburb of Lyon. There are two railway stations in the commune: Miribel station for trains to Lyon, Ambérieu and Chambéry, and Les Échets station for trains to Lyon and Bourg-en-Bresse.

Population

See also
Communes of the Ain department

References

External links

 Miribel

Communes of Ain
Ain communes articles needing translation from French Wikipedia